Edda Award for Best Television Personality (Icelandic: Sjónvarpsmaður ársins) is an award at the Icelandic Film and Television Awards (Edda Awards). The award was first presented at the 2nd Edda Awards in 2000 and has been a part of the awards every year since. The result is decided by the Icelandic public, which is able to vote for their favorite person on television online in a small time period up to the awards. In recent years the award has become highly sought after by the television nominees and they can be quite competitive towards one another up to the award ceremony.

Recipients

References

External links 
 Edda Awards

Edda Awards